Planctomycetia is a class of aquatic bacteria.

Phylogeny

See also
 List of bacterial orders
 List of bacteria genera

References

Planctomycetota
Bacteria classes